Business activity monitoring (BAM) is software that aids the monitoring of business activities which are implemented in computer systems.

The term was originally coined by analysts at Gartner, Inc. and refers to the aggregation, analysis, and presentation of real-time information about activities inside organizations, customers, and partners. A business activity can either be a business process that is orchestrated by a business process management (BPM) software, or that of a series of activities spanning across multiple systems and applications. BAM is intended to provide a summary of business activities to operations managers and upper management.

Description
Business activity monitoring provides real-time information about the status and results of various operations, processes, and transactions. The main benefits of BAM are to enable an enterprise to make better informed business decisions, quickly address problem areas, and re-position organizations to take full advantage of emerging opportunities.

One of the most visible features of BAM is the presentation of information on dashboards containing the key performance indicators (KPIs) used to provide assurance and visibility of activity and performance. This information is used by technical and business operations to provide visibility, measurement, and assurance of key business activities. It can also be exploited by event correlation to detect and warn against impending problems.

Although BAM systems usually use a computer dashboard display to present data, BAM is distinct from the dashboards used by business intelligence (BI) insofar as events are processed in real-time or near real-time and pushed to the dashboard in BAM systems, whereas BI dashboards refresh at predetermined intervals by polling or querying databases. Depending on the refresh interval selected, BAM and BI dashboards can be similar or vary considerably.

Some products provide trouble notification functions, which allows them to interact automatically with the issue tracking system. For example, whole groups of people can be sent e-mails, voice or text messages, according to the nature of the problem. Automated problem solving, where feasible, can correct and restart failed processes.

Processing events
While early technology processed events emitted as the process was being orchestrated, this had the disadvantage of requiring enterprises to invest in BPM before being able to acquire and use BAM. The newer products are based on complex event processing (CEP) technology, and can process high volumes of underlying technical events to derive higher level business events, therefore reducing the dependency on BPM, and providing BAM to a wider audience of customers.

Examples
A bank may be interested in minimizing the amount of capital it borrows overnight from a central bank. Interbank transfers must be communicated and arranged through automation by a set time each business day. The failure of any vital communication could cost the bank large sums in interest charged by the central bank. A system would be programmed to become aware of each message and await confirmation. Failure to receive confirmation within a reasonable amount of time would be grounds to raise an alarm that would set in motion a manual intervention to investigate the cause of the delay, and to push the problem toward resolution before it becomes costly.

Another example involves a mobile telecommunications company interested in detecting a situation whereby new customers are not set up promptly and correctly on their network and within CRM and billing systems. Low-level technical events such as messages passing from one application to another over a middleware system, or transactions detected within a database log file, are processed by a CEP engine. All events relating to an individual customer are correlated in order to detect an anomalous situation whereby an individual customer has not been promptly or correctly provisioned, or set up. An alert can be generated to notify technical operations or to notify business operations, and the failed provisioning step may be restarted automatically.

Related fields
 Business service management
 Business intelligence (BI)
 Business process management (BPM)
 User activity monitoring

References

External links
 BAM overview
 David Luckham on BAM
 WSO2 Business Activity Monitor
 Advantages of Business Activity Monitoring

Business terms
Business software
Information systems
Cognition
Events (computing)